Gábor Péter (born as Benjámin Eisenberger in Újfehértó, 14 May 1906 – Budapest, 23 January 1993) was a Hungarian Communist politician. Between 1945 and 1952 he was the absolute leader of the State Protection Authority (Államvédelmi Hatóság) which was responsible for much brutality and many political purges.

Early life
Born Benjamin Eisenberger to Péter Eisenberger, a Jewish tailor, and Róza Meczner, in Újfehértó, Hungary. During his early years he worked as a tailor. He took part in the labour movements from the early years of the 1920s.

In 1931, he joined the Hungarian Communist Party. At this time he was also a lover of Litzi Friedmann the future first wife of Kim Philby, a member of the Cambridge Five.

Career
In January 1945, he was appointed as leader of the Budapest Department of State Political Police (PRO), the Hungarian secret police. Péter's career rose quickly; he became leader of the Hungarian State Police State Defense Department (ÁVO) and its successor, the State Protection Authority (ÁVH).

In 1952, he was discharged from his position because he was Jewish. Later he was arrested in Mátyás Rákosi's villa. According to historian Tibor Zinner, Gábor Péter was present on an official visit. Unexpectedly a handcuff clicked on his hand put back. After that Mihály Farkas stepped forward from behind the curtain and said: "the game is over". Gábor Péter's wife, Jolán Simon, who served as Rákosi's secretary, was also arrested.

In 1954, a court martial sentenced him to life imprisonment. He was accused of being a Zionist spy and cooperating with László Rajk, Rudolf Slánský and other "agents of international Zionism". In 1957, his term of imprisonment was significantly reduced and in 1959 was released. He later worked as a librarian.

Death
On 23 January 1993, at the age of 86, Péter died of natural causes in a Budapest hospital, Hungary. He was nearly blind. He was survived by his wife, Jolán Simon.

References

Sources 
 Gábor Péter's birth entry Újfehértó births, No. 1906/173.
 

1906 births
1993 deaths
People from Újfehértó
Jewish Hungarian politicians
Jewish socialists
Hungarian Communist Party politicians
Members of the Hungarian Working People's Party